Mt. Sidney Historic District is a national historic district located at Mount Sidney, Augusta County, Virginia. It encompasses 74 contributing buildings and 16 contributing sites in the rural village of Mount Sidney. The oldest buildings date to the 1820s and are located along the west side of the main street.  Notable buildings include the Markwood House (1834), Moorman House (1835), James Ross House (c. 1840), Hyde Tavern (c. 1852), Mt. Sidney Methodist Church and Cemetery (1850), and Mt. Sidney African Methodist Episcopal Church and cemetery (1802, 1865-1875).

It was listed on the National Register of Historic Places in 1998.

References

Historic districts in Augusta County, Virginia
National Register of Historic Places in Augusta County, Virginia
Historic districts on the National Register of Historic Places in Virginia